is the pen name of a Japanese chef who was the personal sushi chef of former North Korean leader Kim Jong-il from 1988 to 2001. Fujimoto published a memoir in 2003 entitled I was Kim Jong-il's Cook, detailing many of his experiences with Kim Jong-il. The veracity of his claims were initially doubted by skeptics. However, Fujimoto correctly predicted that Kim Jong-un (who was relatively unknown at that time) would be appointed as his father's successor as Supreme Leader instead of Kim Jong-nam or Kim Jong-chul, which was contrary to the prevailing consensus of experts on North Korean politics. Fujimoto's prediction proved true in December 2011.

A classified U.S. diplomatic cable from Tokyo, leaked by WikiLeaks, revealed that he was the best and often the sole source of North Korean information for the Cabinet Intelligence and Research Office.

Biography

Arrival in North Korea
Fujimoto first visited North Korea in 1982. Six years later, he became Kim's personal sushi chef on a salary of £45,000 a year, and was given two Mercedes cars. Soon after, he became Kim's companion; both men, according to Kenji, went shooting, riding and water-skiing together. He confirmed a widely believed rumour that Kim had a serious fall from his horse in 1992, breaking his collar bone and lying unconscious for several hours.

Claims
Fujimoto states that Kim Jong-il had a taste for "live fish" and expensive alcohol such as French wines and brandies, particularly Hennessy cognac, while claiming that both Jong-il and his third son, Kim Jong-un, "both like shark fin soup three times a week". According to Fujimoto, he would travel the world for Kim Jong-il, all expenses paid, purchasing Chinese melons, Czech beer, Uzbek caviar, Thai papayas and Danish pork. On one occasion, an envoy was sent to China to retrieve some McDonald's hamburgers. Kim's wine cellar is filled with 10,000 bottles, he said, and the banquets that Kim holds have lasted for four days. Fujimoto also said there is an institute based in Pyongyang staffed by 200 individuals devoted entirely to Kim Jong-il's diet, ensuring he eats the best and most healthy foods.

He also spoke of "Kim's Pleasure Squad": young women chosen to dance for, sing for and bathe Kim, who would be instructed to undress but not allowed to be touched by other guests, saying it amounted to "theft". He said that Kim liked disco music, and preferred watching others dance, rather than dancing himself. Fujimoto said he himself later married one of the women at a drunken wedding, where he passed out on cognac and woke to find his pubic hair shaved.

He has described Kim Jong-il as having a "violent temper". In an interview on Japanese commercial television, he says that Kim Jong-un, then the heir apparent of Jong-il, "knows how to be angry and how to praise. He has the ability to lead people... also he loves basketball, roller-blading, snowboarding and skiing... I watched him play golf once and he reminded me of a top Japanese professional." Fujimoto says he was handed a photo of Jong-un when he was younger, adding they refused to share recent photos with him. He was told not to make the photo public; however, in February 2009, he released the photo. Jong-il's other son, Kim Jong-chul, was said by Jong-il to be "too feminine and unfit for leadership".

In addition to these claims, Fujimoto spoke of a nuclear accident in 1995 at an unnamed plant, where several workers became ill and lost their teeth, and that Kim Jong-il was severely affected by his father's death in 1994, and was even found with a gun at one point. He was also reported to have asked Fujimoto in 1989 what he thought about nuclear weapons.

Escape from North Korea
Fujimoto has stated that he thought about leaving for Japan on several occasions while in North Korea. On a visit to Japan in 1996, he was arrested after carrying a fake Dominican Republic passport. In March 2001, shortly before he escaped via China to Japan for fear he was being spied upon, he said he presented a videotape to Kim Jong-il of a sea urchin dish from a Japanese television show which he promised he would cook for him. Fujimoto said he would travel to Hokkaido to buy some sea urchin, to which Kim replied "That's a great idea. Go for it!" On travelling to Japan, Fujimoto did not return to North Korea, and started living in hiding, after allegedly being targeted by North Korean agents. He appeared on Japanese television with his face obscured as a "Kim Jong-il expert". After publishing his memoir, I was Kim Jong-il's Cook, he wore a bullet-resistant vest.

Return to North Korea
In June 2012, Fujimoto received an invitation from North Korean leader Kim Jong-un, and on July 21, 2012, flew to Pyongyang via Beijing. During his visit, he reportedly visited Kim Jong-un and his wife, and mentioned that Pyongyang had changed significantly over the last decade. In 2017, Fujimoto opened a Japanese restaurant in Pyongyang. In June 2019, media reports suggested Fujimoto had been arrested. However, a month later, the British ambassador to North Korea, Colin Crooks, visited Fujimoto at his restaurant. Japanese tourists are refused visits.

Books
Fujimoto has written three books: Kim's Chef, Kim's Private Life and The Honorable General Who Loved Nuclear Weapons and Girls. His 2003 memoir I was Kim Jong-il's Cook (also known as Kim's Chef) was a best-seller in Japan.

See also

North Korean leader's residences that Kenji Fujimoto witnessed firsthand

References

External links
 Fujimoto, Kenji. (2004). I Was Kim Jong Il's Cook. The Atlantic Monthly. 293(1), 108—109.
 Johnson, Adam. (2013). Dear Leader Dreams of Sushi. GQ July 2013..

1947 births
Living people
Japanese chefs
Japanese memoirists
Japanese writers
Pseudonymous writers
Japanese expatriates in North Korea